The 1991 Triple J Hottest 100 was the third yearly poll of the most popular songs, according to listeners of the Australian radio station Triple J. From 1989 to 1991, listeners could vote for songs released in any year.

There was no poll in 1992, and from 1993 onwards, the poll was restricted to songs released the same year. Supplementary "Hottest 100 of all time" polls allowing songs from any year were held in 1998 and 2009.

This was also the first poll to feature a list for songs in positions #101 to #200. The list was posted on the Triple J website in their Hottest 100 History section until late 2004 under 1992. Despite this, an audio clip from the 1991 Hottest 100 features the announcer jokingly playing "Black or White" by Michael Jackson at the number one song before saying it was actually #113 (although the actual list shows it reached #112).

Full list

21 of the 100 tracks are by Australian artists.

Artists with multiple entries

Nine entries
The Cure (8, 11, 35, 37, 43, 44, 48, 68, 74)

Five entries
R.E.M. (12, 32, 40, 62, 65)

Four entries
The Smiths (6, 29, 36, 72)

Three entries
Nirvana (1, 3, 76)
Hunters and Collectors (4, 45, 53)
Violent Femmes (9, 18, 21)
New Order (10, 24, 55)
Nick Cave (14, 88, 99)
Billy Bragg (22, 57, 75)
The Pixies (28, 91, 94)
Metallica (60, 63, 89)

Two entries
The Stone Roses (7, 81) 
Jane's Addiction (15, 17)
The Church (31, 70)
The Clouds (33, 67)
Pink Floyd (58, 73)
The Doors (59, 78)

Countries represented
 United Kingdom – 43
 United States – 32
 Australia – 21
 Ireland – 3
 New Zealand – 1

References

1991
1991 in Australian music
1991 record charts